Dawn of the Dragon Racers is a 2014 computer-animated short film by DreamWorks Animation and directed by Elaine Bogan and John Sanford. Based on the How to Train Your Dragon film series, the short features the voices of Jay Baruchel and America Ferrera along with the cast from the television series.

The short film takes place three years before the events of the sequel, in between the events of Defenders of Berk and Race to the Edge. In the short, a hunt for a lost sheep turns into a competition between Hiccup and his friends for the first title of Dragon Racing Champion of Berk.

Plot

Hiccup and Snotlout compete and practice catching sheep for the annual Dragon Race, the new and official dragon sport event on Berk. Afterwards, Tuffnut has just finished his new creepy-looking face paint which shocks Astrid, Hiccup and Toothless. Tuffnut says that at least his doesn't look like a target, mocking the new pattern Fishlegs has applied; Fishlegs explains that it's actually the Ingerman family crest.

Snotlout arrives cheering that his new Sheep Launcher finally worked, which Astrid points out that it took him thirty-two tries to get it right. It then cuts to a sequence of sheep launches, which makes it seem that the sheep, wearing a helmet that Snotlout put on it, is invulnerable to pain as it lands on several different locations. Snotlout decides that the sheep launcher is ready for the Dragon Race. Astrid complains and asks since when did he get to make such a decision; Snotlout states it's because he created the sport. Hiccup and Astrid quickly deny that claim, saying that's not how they remember it. Astrid tries to recall the events of how and who invented Dragon Racing.

It cuts to a flashback, shortly after the events of the second season where the Riders are still in their early teens. Berk is getting ready for the traditional annual boat race called the Regatta which starts in a few days, when suddenly a herd of sheep run throughout the village, causing minor trouble. Hiccup asks Gobber what's happening, and Gobber explains that after Silent (now dubbed Not So Silent) Sven broke his silence, his sheep ran out of their pens because they're afraid of his new voice. Stoick and Gobber struggle to gather the sheep, so Stoick orders Hiccup and the gang to round up the sheep as he gets ready for the Regatta; if he has to hear Sven scream any more, he'll put a hook through his own head just to end the torture.

While in the process of catching the sheep, the Riders end up turning it in to an impromptu competition against each other in getting as many sheep as possible; they all arrive back at the pen and discover they all got three sheep each. Astrid points out that there is no winner in this 'competition'. Sven then cries out, alarmed that his prized black sheep is still missing and hoping that it didn't fall down the well again. At the mention of this, the Riders declare the black sheep as a tiebreaker. Hiccup states that it isn't a competition, but it falls on deaf ears: with the exception of Fishlegs, the others have already taken off. Moments later, Snotlout and Hiccup both spot the sheep, and they race towards it head on. Just as Hiccup is about to grab the sheep in his clutches, Gobber blocks his path and they collide, allowing Snotlout to claim the black sheep. Hiccup asks Gobber what's so urgent, and as he tries to remember Stoick calls Hiccup to come meet him, which was what Gobber was about to inform Hiccup about.

Stoick is preparing to set sail down at the docks, and informs Hiccup that he will be gone for several days to get wood from Loki Island: the lumber is lighter and stronger than any other wood they know of, and building their Regatta ship with it will be their secret weapon. He appoints Hiccup to oversee the preparations for the Regatta in his place, which Hiccup isn't excited to hear about due to the fact that he sees boats slowly moving across the harbor to be 'boring'. Stoick justifies that the Regatta is tradition and claims that it is a good way to 'blow off steam'; if Vikings aren't fighting against any enemies they need to fight against each other in competition, illustrated by two Vikings on the next dock over whacking each other with fish. Just as Stoick leaves, Fishlegs creeps in on Hiccup, saying that he is happy for Hiccup, as he considers being in charge of the Regatta as an honor. Fishlegs then helps Meatlug board a ship covered in a big cloth, which is hiding what he is working on. Fishlegs considers himself to be a sailor at heart and is excited that he is now finally old enough to compete; he and Meatlug will be working on their ship until the Regatta.

Meanwhile, at the Academy, Tuffnut is plotting out some rules for the Riders' sheep competition, but is interrupted as Hiccup arrives reluctantly prohibiting them to carry on with their plan as he has Stoick's strict orders to prepare for the Regatta. The next day, Hiccup discovers that the Riders' have disobeyed his order and have carried on the sheep catching. Down below, the villagers are enjoying the Riders' sheep catching competition and say that it is much better than the Regatta. Later, the villagers gather at the Great Hall, growing restless for entertainment and they want to see the Dragon Race again. Hiccup has Toothless quiet down the crowd, then tries to regain their enthusiasm for the Regatta but is unsuccessful.

Inspired by the twins, the crowd wants another Dragon Race. Astrid then says to Hiccup that Stoick isn't going to be back for a few days and points out that the Dragon Race is also a great way to blow off steam. Seeing no other option, Hiccup agrees to have one Dragon Race. As Hiccup points out the starting location of the race, Snotlout and the Twins suggest they should have teams. Snotlout says the teams are already decided, with Snotlout and the twins on one team and Astrid, Hiccup and Fishlegs on the other. The twins then mention their team name, 'Snotnuts'. Hiccup and Astrid then go to get Fishlegs, but after mocking the name 'Snotnuts' he declines joining the race as he and First Mate Meatlug are still too busy getting ready for the Regatta, refusing to back down on his family tradition.

The race starts as Gothi drops the flag signalling the start of the race. They all immediately set off, and a Viking signals Sven to release the sheep. Early in the race, Hiccup manages to get one sheep but the Twins manage to get two. Meanwhile, Astrid and Snotlout both spot one sheep and race head on to get it first, and both of them are relentless to turn around only until Snotlout backs off, fearing collision, allowing Astrid to get the sheep. Late in the race the scores are tallied and the teams are all tied up. As soon as it is stated by Mulch, the Riders head of to get the black sheep as it is the tiebreaker. Both Hiccup and the Twins fail to capture the sheep, and shortly after Astrid and Snotlout spot the black sheep creating another head on race. Just as the two Riders are seconds away from the black sheep, it faints, unexpectedly becoming a static target.

Shortly thereafter, Astrid and Snotlout collide as neither of them backed out, and this causes Astrid's arm to be injured. Snotlout flies off to go get Gothi, but he is still thinking about the game and he grabs the black sheep. Snotlout then runs into a branch and is knocked off Hookfang; the sheep safely lands on top of him. Sometime later at the Great Hall, the uneventful Dragon Race causes the villagers to demand another Dragon Race, but Hiccup tells the villagers the deal was only one Dragon Race and then on to the Regatta. The villagers however are unsatisfied with that and continue to shout for another Dragon Race. Suddenly Snotlout announces that Hiccup is right, but mocks him by saying that it's not like he will beat team Snotnuts anyway.

Astrid wants to back up Hiccup, but she is still injured and cannot take the risk. Snotlout points out that there's no rematch anyway as Hiccup has no teammate, but Hiccup is still determined to continue the Race, so he once again asks Fishlegs to join his team. At first Fishlegs refuses as he is putting the finishing touches on his ship. After he unveils the small ship with a flourish, Toothless can't help but laugh at the decorations. Fishlegs slowly sails out to sea with Meatlug, but Meatlug quickly begins to feel sea sick and vomits lava, causing the ship to immediately sink. Fishlegs quickly changes his mind about accepting the offer.

They both head off to the Academy where the competition is about to start. Just as the flag is about to be dropped, Stoick is suddenly heard screaming Hiccup's name: he has returned earlier than expected. Stoick appears to be in shock to see that this is not the Regatta he'd expected. Hiccup explains that he sometimes has to make difficult choices for the good of the people, and one of those difficult choices is replacing the traditional Regatta event with Dragon Racing. Stoick asks if he did this all by himself, and Hiccup, seeing the other riders awkwardly looking away, has no choice but to agree. Instead of punishing Hiccup for contradicting his order, Stoick allows him to proceed with the event but only if they do it right. Both teams put on face paint, with green paint for team Snotnuts, and red paint for team 'Hicclegs' (which Fishlegs came up with). Stoick explains that it gives the competitors and the game a warrior's feel to it.

Stoick announces to the crowd around the academy the start of the first annual Berk Dragon Race and explains that each white sheep is worth one point, while the Black Sheep is worth five. To make sure no cheating happens (looking particularly at the twins), Stoick appoints Astrid as the referee. Stoick then proclaims that the team who wins the race will have their portrait hung in the Great Hall, and a feast thrown in their honor. Gothi drops the flag and the race is started.

Snotlout quickly manages to grab one sheep, while Hiccup grabs one as well, and the Twins grab two and boast about it to Hiccup. But Fishlegs arrives bringing two sheep. Both teams drop off their sheep at the Academy. Hiccup spots a sheep placed on a raft out on the water, but Snotlout arrives to grab it. Hiccup quickly sets Toothless' tail to boost their speed and is able to snatch the sheep before Snotlout does. Meanwhile, the twins attempt to cheat by stealing sheep that are not Silent Sven's to quickly double their points, but Astrid arrives before they can grab any. Tuffnut protests that "not cheating is not trying"; Astrid has Stormfly drive them off.

Meanwhile, Fishlegs and Hiccup spot a sheep on a mountain and Fishlegs attempts to grab it, but it jumps down causing it to slide down the side. It falls into a crevasse, but luckily Hiccup and Toothless were already there to rescue it. When it is proclaimed by Astrid that the teams are all tied up, Stoick announces that whoever finds the black sheep wins. The Twins quietly talk to each other about putting their 'Super Secret Plan' into action. Fishlegs then has an idea where the black sheep might be, recalling what Sven said earlier about the black sheep always falling into the well. Fishlegs volunteers to go down the well and look for it, while Hiccup waits overhead. The Twins then fly by with the black sheep which shocks Hiccup.

This causes team Snotnuts to win the race, and Snotlout cheers excitedly over his teams' victory. Although disappointed, Hiccup applauds with the crowd. Hiccup congratulates Snotlout, who gloats about it and mocks Hiccup. But just as they are about to take their victory, Fishlegs arrives with the real black sheep, confusing everybody. Sven tells Stoick that there is only one black sheep and Team Snotnuts claims that they have it. Tuffnut then nuzzles the sheep's side with his face and reveals that they had cheated, by painting a regular sheep with black paint. A reversal is announced by Astrid, swapping the victory from Team Snotnuts to Team Hiclegs, making them the first official champions in Dragon Racing. The event closes when Toothless shoots three plasma blasts overhead, dazzling the crowd. Then Stoick finally relieves Hiccup from being the 'acting chief' and Hiccup quickly sets off before his father can change his mind.

The flashback ends and it goes back to the present time, with Hiccup concluding that it technically was Tuffnut who invented Dragon Racing (because he was the one came up with the concepts of the rules) humiliating the three of them, especially Snotlout, who is deeply depressed. Hiccup tries to cheer up Snotlout by saying that he played a part in it, and that the cheating was all him. As Snotlout happily claims that he did cheat, the Twins interrupt that Snotlout actually did not know what they were doing, and knew nothing about the secret plan. When Hiccup just tells them that they should say that they all invented Dragon Racing the Twins reluctantly accept, but Tuffnut still claims that Snotlout did nothing. Furious, Snotlout launches a sheep at Tuffnut, and points out that at least he invented the Sheep Launcher. Then a horn is heard, signalling that it is time for the Dragon Race and all the Riders quickly set off to start.

Having gone from being Dragon Riders to Dragon Racers, thanks to them a new generation of Berk's traditional events was born.

Voice cast
 Jay Baruchel as Hiccup
 America Ferrera as Astrid
 Christopher Mintz-Plasse as Fishlegs
 T.J. Miller as Tuffnut
 Tim Conway as Mulch
 Chris Edgerly as Gobber
 Tom Kenny as Silent Sven
 Nolan North as Stoick
 Zack Pearlman as Snotlout
 Andrée Vermeulen as Ruffnut

Home media
Dawn of the Dragon Racers was released on November 11, 2014 as a special feature on the DVD/Blu-ray/digital release of How to Train Your Dragon 2. It was released on DVD separately on March 3, 2015, with the previously-released Book of Dragons and Legend of the Boneknapper Dragon included as well.

References

External links

 

2014 short films
2014 computer-animated films
2010s adventure films
2010s American animated films
2010s animated short films
American animated short films
American adventure films
2010s children's animated films
20th Century Fox short films
DreamWorks Animation animated short films
2010s English-language films
Animated films based on children's books
How to Train Your Dragon
Films directed by John Sanford
Films scored by John Paesano
Films set on fictional islands
Animated films about dragons
2010s children's adventure films